Intercostal vessels may refer to:
Intercostal arteries
 Posterior intercostal arteries
 Highest intercostal artery
 Anterior intercostal branches of internal thoracic artery
Intercostal veins
 Supreme intercostal vein
 Superior intercostal vein
 Posterior intercostal veins